Number 1 Sports Ground is a multi-use stadium located in Newcastle, New South Wales, and has a nominated capacity of approximately 20,000.

Cricket 
It is currently used mostly for cricket matches, located within National Park. The ground first hosted First-class cricket in 1981 when New South Wales played Queensland. Ground was for many years a stopover on the tour itinerary for many visiting teams as they faced the Northern New South Wales XI. In 1981/82 the ground was allocated a Sheffield Shield match when the SCG was unavailable, and healthy crowds saw No.1 then become host to at least one first-class fixture per year.

Newcastle District Cricket Association also use the Sports Ground for 1st grade matches. It is used primarily for the grand final held every March. In March 2009, Belmont DCC defeated Toronto Workers Kookaburras at the ground to win the premiership.

As of 2014, 20 First-class matches had been played at the ground, the last in 2009. The ground will play host to a match between New South Wales Blues against Western Australia Warriors in Sheffield Shield played from February 25 to 28.

The ground will receive a multi million-dollar upgrade in September 2020. The upgrade will consist of new concrete seating to be added to increase the seating capacity of the ground from 400 to 790 along the Parry St side of the ground, new lighting, drainage, a new fence and sightscreens, resurfacing and a new cricket square with the size of the playing field increased to cater for pre-season Australian Football League games. This will mean that the Newcastle City AFC will have to play at another venue, potentially Hawkins Oval, until No.1 reopens.

The venue could potentially host an AFL Women's fixture in 2022.

Other Sports 
No. 1 Sports Ground is currently used for Australian rules football, cricket and rugby league and has been used for athletics, rugby union and association football at various times. It also hosts the local rugby league and Australian rules football grand finals each year, and is currently used as a home ground by the Newcastle City Australian rules football and cricket clubs.

Concerts 
From 2018 onwards, concerts associated with the Supercars Championship motor racing event, the Newcastle 500, have been held at the venue. A Simple Minds concert took place on 24 November 2018 as part of their "Walk Between Worlds Tour", but a Kiss concert scheduled for 23 November 2019 as part of their One Last Kiss: End of the Road World Tour was cancelled along with the rest of the Australian/New Zealand tour dates.

Attendance records 
Top 5 Sports Attendance Records

Last updated on 13 July 2014

References

External links
 
 cricinfo
 cricketarchive

Starting in the 2009 season, the no 1 Sports ground is also hosting Football (Soccer), as home ground to the inner city's top football club, Cooks Hill United who compete in the ID2 regional competition.

Cricket grounds in New South Wales
Sport in Newcastle, New South Wales